is a Japanese comedy-drama released in 2007 in Japan, directed by Suzuki Matsuo.

It stars Yuki Uchida in the main role, and features two famous movie and anime directors in secondary roles: Hideaki Anno and Shinya Tsukamoto.

Plot 

A patient wakes up in a psychiatric hospital, but does not remember how she got there. She then has to build relationships with fellow patients as she works to discover what happened.

Cast
 Yuki Uchida – Asuka Sakura 
 Kankurō Kudō – Tetsuo Yakihata 
 Yū Aoi – Miki 
 Ryō – Eguchi 
 Yūko Nakamura – Kurita 
 Satoshi Tsumabuki – Komono 
 Shinobu Otake – Nishino 
 Hideaki Anno – Doctor Matsubara 
 Shinya Tsukamoto – Asuka's ex-husband

Links and sources
 

Review at Variety
Review at Japan Times Online
Review at Dreamlogic.net
Review at "Love HK film.com"

References

Japanese comedy films
Films directed by Suzuki Matsuo
2000s Japanese films